Colombo City Centre is a 47-storey mixed-use development, comprising a five-storey  retail space, a 164-room hotel and 192 residential apartments. The building is situated opposite Beira Lake, located at Sir James Pieris Mawatha, Colombo 02.

The development was a joint venture between local company, the Abans Group, and Singaporean company, SilverNeedle Hospitality, at an estimated cost of US$170M. As of 2021, it is wholly owned by Abans Group. The construction was undertaken by Sanken Construction (Pvt.) Ltd.  On the third storey of the retail mall will be a 415-seat food court, with 18-20 food outlets, operated by Food Studio (Sri Lanka). The hotel will be operated by Marriott International.

Location
Colombo City Centre is located in the heart of Colombo, adjacent to Beira Lake at 137, Sir James Pieris Mawatha. It is in close proximity to the primary and secondary business districts of Colombo city.

Design
Designed by Aedas, Singapore and KWA Architects, Sri Lanka.

Construction status
The expected completion and handover of the building was December 2018.

References

Buildings and structures in Colombo
Residential skyscrapers in Sri Lanka
Apartment buildings in Colombo
Shopping malls in Sri Lanka